Baby's Got a Gun is the third and final studio album by English rock band the Only Ones,  released in 1980 by CBS Records in Europe and on Epic Records in America and Japan.

After the lack of commercial success with their previous studio album Even Serpents Shine (1979), the Only Ones decided that it was time for a slight change of pace in their career. In an attempt to give their music a more contemporary sound, they joined forces with Colin Thurston, an in-demand producer famed for having co-engineered David Bowie's "Heroes" and Iggy Pop's Lust for Life (both 1977). Guesting on the album would be Penetration's lead vocalist  Pauline Murray, who sang a duet with Peter Perrett on "Fools", and provided backing vocals for "Me and My Shadow".

The album was re-released on CD in Europe in 2009 on Sony Music Entertainment. The original album is digitally remastered from the original half-inch mix tapes with three additional tracks.

Critical reception

In his consumer guide for the Village Voice, Robert Christgau gave the album a B+ and commented that "Prepunk and for that matter prepub, Peter Perrett may well have been an only one and he fits in now only because this is such a tolerant and/or commercially desperate time. He's not 'power pop', of course – on record, at least, power's got nothing to do with it."

In a retrospective review for AllMusic, critic Mark Deming gave the album three out of five stars and wrote that "Baby's Got a Gun is clearly the weakest of the Only Ones' three original albums, but for all its faults there's plenty here that testifies to the band's strengths; "Why Don't You Kill Yourself", "Strange Mouth", and "The Big Sleep" are splendid songs that show the band still had the goods and "Trouble in the World" and "The Happy Pilgrim" confirm they could reach for a poppier sound without losing their personality in the process."

Track listing

Personnel
Credits are adapted from Baby's Got a Gun liner notes.

The Only Ones
Peter Perrett – lead and background vocals; guitars
John Perry – guitars; grand piano; organ
Alan Mair – bass guitars; lead vocals on "My Way Out of Here"
Mike Kellie – drums
Session musicians
Pauline Murray – co-lead vocals on "Fools"; backing vocals on "Me and My Shadow"
Barrie Evans – rhythm guitar; percussion
Koulla Kakoulli – backing vocals

Production
Colin Thurston – producer; engineer
The Only Ones – producer
Robert Ash – vocal engineer
Kevin Metcalfe – mastering engineer

References

External links

1980 albums
The Only Ones albums
Albums produced by Colin Thurston
Epic Records albums